Cyprinus quidatensis is a species of ray-finned fish in the genus Cyprinus from freshwater habitats in Vietnam.

References

Cyprinus
Fish described in 1999